Adoneus can refer:

"Adoneus", the Latin name of the adonean or adonic (-uu --) unit of Aeolic verse
"Bacchus Adoneus", a Latin epithet of the god Dionysus or Liber
"Adoneus", name for Adonis in Latin poetry